Tom Carrington may refer to:

 Tom Carrington (illustrator)  (1843–1918), Australian journalist, political cartoonist and illustrator
 Tom Carrington (Dynasty character), minor character that appeared in the television series Dynasty in 1985
 Thomas Carrington, updated version of the Dynasty character in the 2017 reboot series